In geometry, the icosahedral honeycomb is one of four compact, regular, space-filling tessellations (or honeycombs) in hyperbolic 3-space. With Schläfli symbol  there are three icosahedra around each edge, and 12 icosahedra around each vertex, in a regular dodecahedral vertex figure.

Description
The dihedral angle of a regular icosahedron is around 138.2°, so it is impossible to fit three icosahedra around an edge in Euclidean 3-space. However, in hyperbolic space, properly scaled icosahedra can have dihedral angles of exactly 120 degrees, so three of those can fit around an edge.

Related regular honeycombs 
There are four regular compact honeycombs in 3D hyperbolic space:

Related regular polytopes and honeycombs 
It is a member of a sequence of regular polychora and honeycombs {3,p,3} with deltrahedral cells:

It is also a member of a sequence of regular polychora and honeycombs {p,5,p}, with vertex figures composed of pentagons:

Uniform honeycombs 

There are nine uniform honeycombs in the [3,5,3] Coxeter group family, including this regular form as well as the bitruncated form, t1,2{3,5,3}, also called truncated dodecahedral honeycomb, each of whose cells are truncated dodecahedra.

Rectified icosahedral honeycomb

The rectified icosahedral honeycomb, t1{3,5,3}, has alternating dodecahedron and icosidodecahedron cells, with a triangular prism vertex figure:
 Perspective projections from center of Poincaré disk model

Related honeycomb
There are four rectified compact regular honeycombs:

Truncated icosahedral honeycomb

The truncated icosahedral honeycomb, t0,1{3,5,3}, has alternating dodecahedron and truncated icosahedron cells, with a triangular pyramid vertex figure.

Related honeycombs

Bitruncated icosahedral honeycomb

The bitruncated icosahedral honeycomb, t1,2{3,5,3}, has truncated dodecahedron cells with a tetragonal disphenoid vertex figure.

Related honeycombs

Cantellated icosahedral honeycomb

The cantellated icosahedral honeycomb, t0,2{3,5,3}, has rhombicosidodecahedron, icosidodecahedron, and triangular prism cells, with a wedge vertex figure.

Related honeycombs

Cantitruncated icosahedral honeycomb

The cantitruncated icosahedral honeycomb, t0,1,2{3,5,3}, has truncated icosidodecahedron, truncated dodecahedron, and triangular prism cells, with a mirrored sphenoid vertex figure.

Related honeycombs

Runcinated icosahedral honeycomb

The runcinated icosahedral honeycomb, t0,3{3,5,3}, has icosahedron and triangular prism cells, with a pentagonal antiprism vertex figure.

 Viewed from center of triangular prism

Related honeycombs

Runcitruncated icosahedral honeycomb

The runcitruncated icosahedral honeycomb, t0,1,3{3,5,3}, has truncated icosahedron, rhombicosidodecahedron, hexagonal prism, and triangular prism cells, with an isosceles-trapezoidal pyramid vertex figure.

The runcicantellated icosahedral honeycomb is equivalent to the runcitruncated icosahedral honeycomb.

 Viewed from center of triangular prism

Related honeycombs

Omnitruncated icosahedral honeycomb

The omnitruncated icosahedral honeycomb, t0,1,2,3{3,5,3}, has truncated icosidodecahedron and hexagonal prism cells, with a phyllic disphenoid vertex figure.

 Centered on hexagonal prism

Related honeycombs

Omnisnub icosahedral honeycomb

The omnisnub icosahedral honeycomb, h(t0,1,2,3{3,5,3}), has snub dodecahedron, octahedron, and tetrahedron cells, with an irregular vertex figure. It is vertex-transitive, but cannot be made with uniform cells.

Partially diminished icosahedral honeycomb

The partially diminished icosahedral honeycomb or parabidiminished icosahedral honeycomb, pd{3,5,3}, is a non-Wythoffian uniform honeycomb with dodecahedron and pentagonal antiprism cells, with a tetrahedrally diminished dodecahedron vertex figure. The icosahedral cells of the {3,5,3} are diminished at opposite vertices (parabidiminished), leaving a pentagonal antiprism (parabidiminished icosahedron) core, and creating new dodecahedron cells above and below.

See also 
 Convex uniform honeycombs in hyperbolic space
 Regular tessellations of hyperbolic 3-space
 Seifert–Weber space
 11-cell - An abstract regular polychoron which shares the {3,5,3} Schläfli symbol.

References 

Coxeter, Regular Polytopes, 3rd. ed., Dover Publications, 1973. . (Tables I and II: Regular polytopes and honeycombs, pp. 294–296)
Coxeter, The Beauty of Geometry: Twelve Essays, Dover Publications, 1999  (Chapter 10: Regular honeycombs in hyperbolic space, Summary tables II,III,IV,V, p212-213)
 Norman Johnson Uniform Polytopes, Manuscript
 N.W. Johnson: The Theory of Uniform Polytopes and Honeycombs, Ph.D. Dissertation, University of Toronto, 1966 
 N.W. Johnson: Geometries and Transformations, (2018) Chapter 13: Hyperbolic Coxeter groups
 

Honeycombs (geometry)
Self-dual tilings